The EXW qualification (referred to as Expeditionary Warfare Specialist) is a warfare qualification awarded to enlisted United States Navy personnel assigned to U.S. Navy expeditionary combat units, who satisfactorily complete the required qualification course and pass a qualification board hearing. The program was approved July 31, 2006 by then-Chief of Naval Operations Adm. Michael Mullen.

The qualification was developed to provide a chance for enlisted sailors in the naval service's Expeditionary Combat community (those serving in a maritime security or combat related role) to earn a warfare qualification. Core qualification skills will include weapons qualification and maintenance, marksmanship, land navigation, patrolling, field communications, and expeditionary camp deployment.

The first awardee was Petty Officer 2nd Class (EXW/SW) Carl P. Hurtt, Jr, assigned to Mobile Security Squadron Seven (MSS-7).

Types of Expeditionary Warfare Specialist Qualification Platforms
Navy Expeditionary Combat Command (NECC) units, including:

 Maritime Expeditionary Security Groups / Squadrons
 Navy Expeditionary Intelligence Command (NEIC)
 Explosive Ordnance Disposal Mobile Units
 Naval Mobile Construction Battalions
 Mobile Diving and Salvage Units
 Navy Expeditionary Logistics units (includes Navy Cargo Handling Battalions, Navy Expeditionary Logistic Regiments, NAVELSG, and Expeditionary Communications Detachments)
 Naval Special Warfare

Breast insignia

The design of the new pin encompasses the essence of enlisted expeditionary Sailors, presenting the bow and superstructure of a Sea Ark 34' patrol boat from Inshore Boat Units superimposed upon a crossed cutlass and M16A1 rifle.  The waves represent the Navy's heritage, the cutlass represents the enlisted force, the M16A1 represents an NECC mission area and the boat, another NECC mission area. The background is the traditional ocean swells of the Enlisted Surface Warfare Specialist badge.

See also

List of United States Navy enlisted warfare designations
Badges of the United States Navy
Badges of the United States Coast Guard
Port Security Unit
Uniforms of the United States Navy
Military badges of the United States
Naval Coastal Warfare
Mobile Inshore Undersea Warfare Unit
Maritime Expeditionary Security Force
Expeditionary warfare

References

Expediationary Warfare Specialist